Česko Slovenská SuperStar (English: Czech&Slovak SuperStar) is the joint Czech-Slovak version of Idol series' Pop Idol merged from Česko hledá SuperStar and Slovensko hľadá SuperStar which previous to that had three individual seasons each.
The first season premiered in September 2009 with castings held in Prague, Brno, Bratislava and Košice. It is broadcast on two channels: TV Nova (Czech Republic) and Markíza (Slovakia) which have also been the broadcast stations for the individual seasons. Also both hosts have been their hosts countries before as have been three out of the four judges.
To legitimate a fair chance for each country's contestants to reach the final, twelve of the contestants will compete split into genders and nationalities in the semifinals, guaranteeing a 50% share for each country in the top 12.

Regional auditions
Auditions were held in Bratislava, Košice, Prague, Brno in the spring of 2009.

Divadlo
In Divadlo where 124 contestants. The contestants first emerged on stage in groups of 9 or 10 but performed solo unaccompanied, and those who did not impress the judges were cut after the group finished their individual performances. 50 made it to the next round Dlouhá cesta. 24 contestants made it to the Semi-final.

Semi-final
24 semifinalists were revealed in September when the show premiered on screen. Six boys and six girls from both countries competed for a spot in the top 12. In three Semifinals the guys performed on Saturday and the girls on Sunday night. The following Monday the lowest vote-getter from each gender and country got eliminated (the viewers could vote for contestants from both countries). It means that three Czech and Slovak boys and three Czech and Slovak girls would make the finals.

Top 24 - Females

Top 24 - Males

Top 20 - Females

Top 20 - Males

Top 16 - Females

Top 16 - Males

Finalist

Finals

Twelve contestants reached the finals. TOP 12 consisted of 3 Slovak boys, 3 Czech boys, 3 Slovak girls and 3 Czech girls. The first single recorded by TOP 12 is called "Příběh Nekončí / Príbeh Nekončí" (The Story Doesn't End) and it was composed by judge Pavol Habera (music) and Slovak poet Daniel Hevier. Every final night had a different theme. The audience could vote for contestants from the very beginning of the show, voting ended during the result show the following day. There were double eliminations in first two final rounds, with only one contestant being eliminated once the candidates became the TOP 8. All gender and nationality quotas are abolished in the finals.

Top 12 – My Idol

Top 10 – Big Band

Top 8 – Michael Jackson vs. Madonna

Top 7 – Rock

Top 6 – Karel Gott and Duets
Mentor: Karel Gott

Top 5 – MTV

Top 4 – Movie Songs and Michal David
Mentor: Michal David

Top 3 – Richard Müller and Unplugged
Mentor: Richard Müller

Top 2 – Finale

 TOP 12 Performance: Do They Know It's Christmas?

Elimination chart

Contestants who appeared on other seasons/shows
 Lucia Láncošová was a semi-finalist on Slovensko má talent.

External links 
Official Czech homepage hosted by Nova
Official Slovak homepage hosted by Markíza

Season 01
2009 Czech television seasons
2009 Slovak television seasons